The 1980 Lafayette Leopards football team was an American football team that represented Lafayette College as an independent during the 1980 NCAA Division I-AA football season.

In their tenth year under head coach Neil Putnam, the Leopards compiled a 3–7 record. Steve MacCorkle and Ed Rogulsky were the team captains.

Lafayette played its home games at Fisher Field on College Hill in Easton, Pennsylvania.

Schedule

References

Lafayette
Lafayette Leopards football seasons
Lafayette Leopards football